Rhinebeck Central School District (Rhinebeck CSD) is a school district primarily in the Town of Rhinebeck in the Hudson Valley region of the U.S. state of New York. The district is situated along the East Bank of the Hudson River and is approximately 90 miles north of New York City, and 61 miles south of Albany, approximately 26 miles south of Hudson, and 18 miles north of Poughkeepsie.

The district operates three schools; one primary, middle, and secondary school each. Throughout the district, there are about 963 students and 107 teachers. It entirely encompasses the Town of Rhinebeck, while also stretching into the towns of Red Hook, Milan, Clinton, and upper Hyde Park.

50% of the students are male, and the remaining 50 are female. 83% of the students are white, while the remaining 17% are a variety of races. 21% of the students come from low-income families, and 2% are learning English.

Schools 
There are three schools in the district altogether. There is one Primary school, one Middle school, and one Secondary school.

References 

School districts in New York (state)